New Iran Party is a translation used for the name of two distinct political parties in Iran:
 Iran-e-No Party (1927)
 Iran Novin Party (1963–1975)